Rainy in Glenageary is a feature documentary from Irish director Graham Jones about the unsolved 1999 murder of Dublin schoolgirl Raonaid Murray.

References

2019 films
Irish documentary films
2010s English-language films